The NaviDrive system is  voice-activated radio, CD player, telephone, and navigation system (GPS) all in one unit, assembled in Citroën (Citroën C8, C6, C5, C4 and C3) and Peugeots vehicles. It includes a special function for reading back incoming text messages and dedicated buttons for dialling up the emergency or recovery services (to whom it can indicate the car position).

Its main functions and characteristics are:

- monochrome or 7" color screen

- Complete GPS Navigation system

- Radio, CD player with MP3 and CD changer for 6 CDs

- Integrated GSM dual band handsfree telephone

- Text-to-speech (reading of SMS messages)

- Voice recognition ("guide to John",...)

- Real-time traffic information (RDS-TMC)

In certain countries (France, Germany, Spain, Italy, Belgium, Netherlands and Luxemburg), in the case of an accident (by pressing a button or automatically when an airbag deploys), this system sends a text message containing the exact GPS position of the vehicle followed by a voice call to a special telephonic assistance platform which receives the position and the voice call. This platform determines the kind of urgency (medical, accident, fire,...) by asking a few questions and sends the appropriate emergency services to the exact location of the vehicle.

See also
 Citroën
 On-Star

Navigational equipment
Global Positioning System